Mariana or Maria Anna of Austria (24 December 1634 - 16 May 1696), was Queen of Spain from 1649, when she married her uncle Philip IV of Spain, until his death in 1665. She was then appointed regent for their three-year-old son Charles II, and due to his ill health remained an influential figure until she died in 1696.

Her regency was overshadowed by the need to manage Spain's post-1648 decline as the dominant global power, along with internal political divisions and a general European economic crisis during the latter half of the 17th century. The inability of her son Charles II of Spain to produce an heir led to constant manoeuvring by other European powers, which ultimately ended in the 1701 to 1714 War of the Spanish Succession. The Mariana Islands chain in the northwest Pacific Ocean, and the associated Mariana Trench, are named after her.

Early life 

 

Maria Anna was born on 24 December 1634 in Wiener Neustadt, second child of Maria Anna of Spain and her husband Ferdinand (1608–1657), who became Holy Roman Emperor in 1637. Her parents had six children, of whom only Maria Anna and two brothers survived to adulthood; Ferdinand (1633–1654), and Leopold (1640–1705), elected emperor in 1658.

Queen of Spain 

The Habsburgs often married within the family to retain their lands and properties, and in 1646 Maria Anna was betrothed to her cousin and heir to the Spanish throne, Balthasar Charles, Prince of Asturias. His death three months later left her without a prospective husband and her widowed uncle Philip IV without an heir. On 7 October 1649, the 44-year-old Philip married his 14-year-old niece in Navalcarnero, outside Madrid; from then on, she was known by her Spanish name 'Mariana.' The exclusion of women from political life meant she focused on religion and education, which society viewed as fitting women's role as nurturers and providers of moral guidance. 

Only two of their five children survived to adulthood; the eldest, Margaret Theresa (1651–1673), married her maternal uncle Leopold I, Holy Roman Emperor in 1666. Mariana's second daughter, Maria Ambrosia, lived only fifteen days, followed by two sons, Philip Prospero (1657–1661) and Ferdinand Thomas (1658–1659). On 6 November 1661, Mariana gave birth to her last child, Charles, later known as El Hechizado or "The Bewitched", in the belief his disabilities were caused by "sorcery." In his case, the so-called Habsburg jaw was so pronounced he spoke and ate with difficulty all his life. He did not learn to walk until he was eight and never attended school, but foreign observers noted his mental capacities remained intact; others speculated the Regents overstated his defects to retain political control.

It has been suggested Charles suffered from the endocrine disease acromegaly and a combination of rare genetic disorders often transmitted through recessive genes, including combined pituitary hormone deficiency and distal renal tubular acidosis. However, his elder sister did not appear to suffer the same issues and the authors of the most significant study state it has not been demonstrated (his) disabilities...were caused by...recessive alleles inherited from common ancestors. Regardless of the cause, Charles suffered ill health throughout his life, and the Spanish court was split by the struggle between his co-heirs, Louis XIV and Emperor Leopold. His death was expected almost from birth; he was "short, lame, epileptic, senile and completely bald before 35,...repeatedly baffling Christendom by continuing to live."

Regency

First regency: 1665–1677
Charles was only three years old when Philip died on 17 September 1665, and Mariana was appointed regent, advised by a Regency Council, until he became a legal adult at the age of 14. She adopted the system of using a valido or 'favourite' established by Philip in 1620 and widely used elsewhere in Europe. The first of these was Juan Everardo Nithard, an Austrian Jesuit and her personal confessor who came with her from Vienna; as Philip's will excluded foreigners from the Regency Council, he had to be naturalised, causing immediate resentment. 

A 'foreigner' herself, the two men habitually identified as her 'favourites' were also outsiders; Nithard was succeeded by Valenzuela, who came from the lower rank of Spanish nobility. Even modern accounts of her reign often reflect contemporary sources that viewed women as incapable of ruling on their own and thus imply a sexual relationship. Mariana used a variety of advisors, including Count Peñaranda and the Marquis de Aytona; historian Silvia Mitchell disputes whether Nithard or Valenzuela were 'validos', since Mariana used them to retain power, rather than delegating it. Despite the emphasis put on her male advisors, she also had female advisors, notably Mariana Engracia Álvarez de Toledo Portugal y Alfonso-Pimentel.  

Her son's poor health and lack of an heir led to an ongoing struggle between Mariana's 'Austrian' faction, and a 'French' faction, led until his death in 1679 by his illegitimate half-brother, John of Austria the Younger. Spain was also divided into the Crowns of Castile and Aragon, whose very different political cultures made it almost impossible to enact reforms or increase taxes. As a result, government finances were in perpetual crisis, the Crown declaring bankruptcy in 1647, 1652, 1661 and 1666. 

This combination of issues meant Mariana faced challenges that would have daunted the most competent ruler; Spain was financially exhausted by almost a century of continuous war, while her reign coincided with the Little Ice Age, a period of cold weather during the second half of the 17th century. Between 1692 and 1699, crops failed across Europe and an estimated 5–10% of the population starved to death.

The new government also inherited a wide range of economic and political problems. The long-running Portuguese Restoration War was the most urgent, followed in May 1667 by the War of Devolution, when France invaded the Spanish Netherlands and the Spanish province of Franche-Comté. The need to reduce spending resulted in the 1668 treaties of Aix-la-Chapelle and Lisbon ended the wars with France and Portugal.

Peace ended the constant drain of Spanish resources, while Aix-La-Chapelle forced France to return most of the territories over-run in 1667 to 1668. Despite this, the army consisted them a humiliation; in June 1668, Joseph Malladas, an Aragonese captain living in Madrid, was executed for plotting to murder Nithard, reputedly on John's behalf. 

This power struggle ended with Nithard being appointed Ambassador to Rome in February 1669; he was succeeded as valido by Aytona, who died in 1670 and was replaced by Valenzuela, a member of her household since 1661. In 1672, Spain was dragged into the Franco-Dutch War; Valenzuela was dismissed when Charles came of age in 1675, but Spanish policy continued to be undermined by the struggle for power. Mariana reinstated the regency in 1677 on the grounds of Charles's ill-health and Valenzuela was restored, before John finally gained control in 1677.

Second regency: 1679–1696
John of Austria the Younger died in September 1679 and Mariana became regent once again; one of his final acts was arranging the marriage of Charles to 17-year-old Marie Louise of Orléans, which took place in November 1679. She died in February 1689, without producing an heir; as with many deaths of the period, limited medical knowledge led to allegations she was poisoned. Modern assessments of her symptoms conclude it was almost certainly appendicitis, possibly from the treatments undertaken to improve fertility.

Her replacement was Maria Anna of Neuburg, one of 12 children whose family reputation for fertility made them popular choices for royal marriages. Of her sisters, Maria Sophia married Peter II of Portugal, while Eleonore was the third wife of Emperor Leopold. Maria Anna was aunt to future emperors Joseph I and Charles VI, making her an ideal choice for the Austrian faction.

Charles remained childless; by that time, he was almost certainly impotent, his autopsy later revealing he had only one atrophied testicle. As his health declined, internal struggles over the succession became increasingly bitter, leadership of the pro-French faction passing to Fernández de Portocarrero, Cardinal and Archbishop of Toledo.

Under the influence of the 'Austrians,' in 1690 Spain joined the Grand Alliance in the Nine Years' War with France. It declared bankruptcy again in 1692 and by 1696, France occupied most of Catalonia; Mariana retained power with the support of German auxiliaries under Maria Anna's brother Charles Philip, many of whom were expelled after Mariana's death. She died on 16 May 1696 at the Uceda Palace in Madrid, at the age of sixty-one; the cause is thought to have been breast cancer.

Issue 

 As Queen of Spain from 1649 to 1665:
 Margaret Theresa (12 July 1651-12 March 1673), who married Leopold I, Holy Roman Emperor, in 1666.
 Maria Ambrosia de la Concepción (7–21 December 1655), died in infancy
 Philip Prospero, Prince of Asturias (28 November 1657-1 November 1661), died in childhood
 Ferdinand Thomas, Infante of Spain (21 December 1658-23 October 1659), died in infancy
 Charles II of Spain (6 November 1661-1 November 1700)

Legacy
In 1668, Mariana approved the establishment of a Jesuit mission under Diego Luis de San Vitores and Saint Pedro Calungsod on a series of islands the Spanish referred to as the Ladrones, which were renamed the Mariana Islands in her honour.

The Portrait of Mariana of Austria painted by Diego Velázquez was commissioned by Philip and is the only known full-length painting of her. The original is in the Prado Museum in Madrid; a copy was sent to her father Ferdinand and is held by the Kunsthistorisches Museum in Vienna. Several other portraits of her were made, including Juan Bautista Martínez del Mazo's Queen Mariana of Spain in Mourning, 1666. She also appears as a detail in Velasquez' masterpiece Las Meninas which features her daughter Margaret Theresa.

Family tree

|-
|

|-
|style="text-align: left;"|Notes:

References

Sources
 
 
 
 
 
 
 
 
 
 
 
 
 
 
 
 Stolicka, Ondrej. Different German Perspectives on Spanish Politics in the 1670s: The Reaction of Vienna and Berlin on the Coup of Juan José de Austria in the Year 1677, JEHM 23(4), 2019, pp. 367–385. https://doi.org/10.1163/15700658-00002638

External links
 
 
 

|-

1634 births
1696 deaths
17th-century viceregal rulers
Spanish royal consorts
Philip IV of Spain
Queen mothers
Regents of Spain
Austrian princesses
Deaths from breast cancer
Deaths from cancer in Spain
Burials in the Pantheon of Kings at El Escorial
Royal consorts of Naples
Royal consorts of Sicily
Austrian expatriates in Italy
Austrian expatriates in Spain
Nobility from Vienna
People from Wiener Neustadt
Spanish people of Austrian descent
17th-century House of Habsburg
17th-century women rulers
17th-century Spanish monarchs
17th-century Spanish women
Daughters of emperors
Children of Ferdinand III, Holy Roman Emperor
Daughters of kings